This is a list of reputed martyrs of Christianity; it includes only notable people with Wikipedia articles. Not all Christian denominations accept every figure on this list as a martyr or Christian—see the linked articles for fuller discussion. In many denominations of Christianity, martyrdom is considered a direct path to sainthood and many names on this list are viewed as saints in one or more denomination.

Apostolic Age—1st century

According to the Gospels and Acts of the Apostles 
Holy Innocents of Bethlehem 
John the Baptist 
Stephen (Protomartyr)  
James, son of Zebedee 
Antipas

According to early sources 
James, brother of Jesus - attested by Josephus ca. AD 94
Simon Peter, first attested by Tertullian about AD 200 
Paul the Apostle, first attested by Ignatius of Antioch probably about AD 110

According to tradition
Andrew the Apostle 
Matthew the Apostle - not attested by contemporary sources
Philip the Apostle - conflicting accounts
Thomas the Apostle
Jude Thaddeus
Bartholomew - conflicting accounts
Barnabas
Simon Zelotes - contradictory late traditions.
Mark the Evangelist
Timothy - not attested by contemporary sources
Philemon - not attested by contemporary sources

Age of Martyrdom—2nd to 4th centuries

According to early Christian tradition

With some historical attestation within a hundred years of the event
Polycarp of Smyrna
Justin Martyr
Scillitan Martyrs
Perpetua and Felicity
Ptolemaeus and Lucius
Pothinus, bishop of Lyon, with Blandina and several others, the "Martyrs of Lyon and Vienne"
Pope Fabian
Sebastian
 Shmona and GuryaAgnes of Rome
Felix and Adauctus
Marcellinus and Peter
 Forty Martyrs of Sebaste
Euphemia
Cyprian

 With some historical attestation more than a hundred years after the event 

Saint Alban
Ignatius of Antioch
Gelasinus
Saint Pancras
Saint Valentine
Benedict of Monacilioni
Saint Petronilla

 Largely or wholly legendary 

Saint Afra
Saint George
Januarius
Vincent of Saragossa
Saint Behnam 
Saint Lucy
Lawrence of Rome
Saint Cecilia
Catherine of Alexandria
Saint Vitus the Martyr
Pelagia of Tarsus
Sophia the Martyr and her three daughters Faith, Hope and Charity

 Middle Ages—5th to 15th-centuries 

Tewdrig, 6th c.
Boethius, 6th c.
Sigismund of Burgundy, 524
Edwin of Northumbria, 633 in the Battle of Hatfield Chase
Oswald of Northumbria, 642 in the Battle of Maserfield
Projectus of Clermont, 676
Warinus of Poitiers, 677
Dagobert II of the Franks, 676
Kilian, Colman, and Totnan, 689 
Fructus, Valentine & Engratia of Segovia, ca. 715 
Theofrid of Orange, 728/-32 by Saracens
Porcarius of Lérins, ca. 732 by Saracens
Boniface, 754
Æthelberht II of East Anglia, 794
Martyrs of Iona, 806 by Vikings
Gohard of Nantes, 843 by Normans
Roderick, Eulogius, Perfectus, Laura, Flora and Maria, Aurelius and Natalia, Nunilo and Alodia, and other Martyrs of Cordoba, 850-59
Bertharius of Monte Cassino, 883 by Saracens
Edmund of East Anglia, 869
Ludmila of Bohemia, 921
Wiborada of St. Gall, 921 by Magyars
Wenceslaus I, Duke of Bohemia, 935
King Edward the Martyr, 979
Adalbert of Prague, 997 by Old Prussians
Bruno of Querfurt, 1009
Jovan Vladimir, 1014
Olaf II of Norway, 1030 in the Battle of Stiklestad
Gerard of Csanád, 1046
Stanislaus of Szczepanów, 1079
Canute IV of Denmark, 1086
William of Norwich, 1144 (cult suppressed) 
Eric IX of Sweden, 1161
Thomas Becket, 1170 - The most famous martyr of the Middle Ages.
Berard of Carbio and companions, 1220
Serapion of Algiers, 1240
Buzád Hahót, 1241
Peter of Verona, 1252 by Cathars - Canonized 11 months after his death; the fastest in history.
Martyrs of Sandomierz, 1260
Antonio Pavoni, 1374 by Waldensians
Tsar Lazar, 1389
Nicholas Tavelic, 1391
John of Nepomuk, 1393
Jan Huss (1415) and Jerome of Prague (1416) - executed for heresy by the Roman Catholic Council of Constance

 Reformation Era—16th century 

Jan van Essen and Hendrik Vos, 1523, burned at the stake, early Lutheran martyrs
Jan de Bakker, 1525, burned at the stake
Felix Manz, 1527
Patrick Hamilton, 1528, burned at the stake, early Lutheran martyr
George Blaurock, 1529
St Thomas More, 1535, executed
St John Fisher, 1535
William Tyndale, 1535
Carthusian Martyrs, 1535–1537
St. Arthur of Glastonbury, 1539
Margaret Pole, 1541
Juan de Padilla, Spanish missionary to New Mexico, 1542
Mannar Catholic martyrs (1544)
Anne Askew, 1546
George Wishart, 1546
Luis de Cancer, Spanish missionary to La Florida, 1549
Lady Jane Grey, 1554
Hugh Latimer, 1555
Nicholas Ridley, 1555
Rowland Taylor, 1555
John Hooper, 1555
John Rogers, 1555
William Hunter, 1555
Lawrence Saunders, 1555
Thomas Cranmer, 1556
Dirk Willems, 1569
Martyrs of Gorkum, 1572, including Nicholas Pieck and John of Cologne
St Edmund Campion, 1581
Margaret Ball, 1584
The Forty Martyrs of England and Wales, various dates

 Modern Era—17th to 21st centuries 

Martyrs of Japan, 1597-1639, (see also Kakure Kirishitan'')
Francis Taylor, 1621
Vietnamese Martyrs, 1625 - 1886
Magdalene of Nagasaki, 1634
Lorenzo Ruiz, 1637
Canadian Martyrs, North American Martyrs, 1642–1649
Arthur Bell, O.F.M., 1643
Isaac Jogues, S.J., 1646
John de Britto, 1647–1693, born in Portugal and beheaded in India
Francis Ferdinand de Capillas, O.P., 1648, missionary to China
Diego Luis de San Vitores, S.J., and Pedro Calungsod, 1672
Feodosia Morozova, 1675, Russian Old Believer
Oliver Plunkett, 1681, Archbishop of Armagh
Felipe Songsong, S.J., 1685
Salem Witch Trials, 1692
Devasahayam Pillai, 1712-1752
Constantin Brâncoveanu, 1714
Jean-Pierre Aulneau, Jean Baptiste de La Vérendrye, and 19 other voyageurs, 1736
Vicente Liem de la Paz, O.P., 1773
Luís Jayme, O.F.M., Spanish missionary to Alta California, 1775
Cosmas of Aetolia, 1779
Francisco Garcés, Spanish missionary to Alta California, 1781
Martyrs of Compiegne, 1794
Andrés Quintana, Spanish missionary to Alta California, 1812
Chinese Martyrs (various Christian denominations), 19th and 20th centuries
Pedro Marieluz Garces, 1825
Tārore, 1836
Andrew Dung-Lac (Vietnamese Catholic), 1839
Joseph Smith, 1844
Hyrum Smith, 1844
Korean Martyrs, 1839, 1846, 1866
Peter Chanel, S.M., 1841
Andrew Kim Taegon, 1846
Marcus Whitman, Narcissa Whitman, and companions, 1847
Lucy Yi Zhenmei, one of the 19th century Chinese Catholic Martyrs, 1862
Thomas Baker, 1867, English missionary killed and eaten, Fiji
Martyrs of Uganda, 1885–1887
Victor Emilio Moscoso Cárdenas, S.J., 1897
Amandina of Schakkebroek, F.M.M., 1900
Maria Goretti (died defending herself from being raped), 1902
Armenian Martyrs, 1915-1923
Grand Duchess Elizabeth Fyodorovna, 1918
Tsar Nicholas II of Russia and Family, 1918
Nun Barbara (Yakovleva), 1918
James Coyle, 1921
Gregory of Cydonia, 1922
Manuel Gómez González, 1924
Adílio Daronch, 1924
Saints of the Cristero War 1926–1927, including:
Miguel Pro, S.J., 1927
Cristóbal Magallanes Jara, 1927
Mateo Correa Magallanes, 1927
Toribio Romo González, 1928
Manche Masemola, (1913–1928)
José Sánchez del Río 1928
Albertina Berkenbrock, 1931, killed in hatred of faith while resisting a rape attempt
Innocencio of Mary Immaculate, C.P., 1934
John and Betty Stam, 1934
Bartolome Blanco Marquez, 1936
Martyrs of the Spanish Civil War 1934, 1936–1939
Alexander Hotovitzky, 1937
Peter of Jesus Maldonado, 1937
Paul Schneider (pastor), 1939
Martyrs of Songkhon, 1940
Maximilian Kolbe, O.F.M. Conv., 1941, murdered in Auschwitz
Benigna Cardoso da Silva, 1941, killed in hatred of faith while resisting a rape attempt
Edith Stein O.C.D., 1942, murdered in Auschwitz
Gorazd, 1942, Bishop of Prague
Lucian Tapiedi, 1942
Franz Jägerstätter, 1943
Sophie Stoll, 1921-1943, a devout Lutheran executed by the Nazis for her anti-Nazi activism
Dusty Miller, 1945, a Methodist layman killed as a P.O.W. of the Japanese in Thailand during World War II
Marcel Callo, 1945
Dietrich Bonhoeffer, 1945, Lutheran pastor and member of the German Resistance
Rolando Rivi, fourteen-year-old seminarian, 1945
Peter To Rot, 1945
Martyrs of Albania, 1945-1974
Theodore Romzha, 1947, Ruthenian Eparch of Mukachevo
Nykyta Budka, 1949, Ukrainian Bishop of Canada, died in Soviet gulag
Beda Chang, S.J., 1951
Alberto Hurtado, S.J., 1952
Francis Xavier Ford, M.M., 1952
Martyrs of Laos, 1954-1970
Zdenka Cecilia Schelingová, 1955
Jim Elliot, 1956
Nate Saint, 1956, killed while attempting to evangelize the Waodani people
Ed McCully, 1956
Pete Fleming, 1956
Roger Youderian, 1956
Esther John 1929–1960, Found Killed in Chichawatni commemorated at Westminster Abbey.
Wang Zhiming, 1973, Chinese pastor, publicly executed
Martyrs of La Rioja, 1976
Janani Jakaliya Luwum, 1977, Archbishop of Uganda
Abuna Theophilos, 1979, Patriarch of the Ethiopian Orthodox Tewahedo Church
Gudina Tumsa, 1979, Ethiopian theologian
Óscar Romero, 1980, Archbishop of San Salvador
Ita Ford, M.M., 1980
Maura Clarke, M.M., 1980
Dorothy Kazel, O.S.U., 1980
Jean Donovan, 1980
Stanley Rother, 1981
Isabel Cristina Mrad Campos, 1982, killed in hatred of faith while resisting a rape attempt
Jerzy Popiełuszko, 1984
Lindalva Justo de Oliveira, 1993, killed in hatred of faith while resisting a rape attempt
Martyrs of Algeria, 1994-1996
Rani Maria Vattalil, 1995
 Graham Staines ,[India],1999, 
Kosheh Martyrs, Egypt, 1998–2000
Rufus Halley, S.S.C., 2001
David Paget, 2001
Martin Burnham, 2002
Mary Stachowicz, 2002
Andrea Santoro, 2006
Fabianus Tibo, 2006
Leonella Sgorbati, 2006
Ragheed Ganni and companions, 2007
Paulos Faraj Rahho, 2008, Chaldean Archeparch of Mosul
Nicholas Pillai Pakiaranjith, 2008
2008 Kandhamal violence, 2008
Nag Hammadi martyrs, Egypt 2010
Baghdad martyrs, 2010
Luigi Padovese, 2011
Shahbaz Bhatti, 2011
Nigerian martyrs, 2012
Frans van der Lugt, S.J., 2014
Christians (ن) martyred by ISIL, 2014-2019
21 Coptic Martyrs of Libya, 2015
Jacques Hamel, Normandy 2016
Cairo martyrs, 2016
Alexandria martyrs, 2017
Sutherland Springs martyrs, 2017
John Allen Chau, 2018
Sri Lankan martyrs, 2019
David Amess, Essex 2021

See also
List of Christian women of the patristic age
List of Christians killed during the Diocletian Persecution
Unitarian martyrs

References

 
Martyr
Martyr
Persecution of early Christians